Ocotea moschata is a tree of the Caribbean region.  Its vernacular names include nuez moscada, and cimarrona (Spanish) and nemoca and nutget (English). It is native to Puerto Rico.  This tree is common in the Toro Negro State Forest.

References

moschata
Endemic flora of Puerto Rico
Trees of the Caribbean
Flora without expected TNC conservation status